Joseph Ellis Pasquale (born 20 August 1961) is an English comedian, actor and television presenter.

He won the fourth series of I'm a Celebrity...Get Me Out of Here! in 2004 and participated in the eighth series of Dancing on Ice in 2013. He also hosted the revived version of the game show The Price is Right.

Career

Stage
Pasquale's live shows include Live and Squeaky (1996), Twin Squeaks (1997), The Crazy World of Joe Pasquale (1998), Bubble and Squeak (2000), The Everything I Have Ever Done & The First of Many Goodbye Tours (2004), Does He Really Talk Like That? The Live Show (2005) and Return of the Love Monkey (2006).

In 1999, Pasquale made his stage acting debut in Larry Shue's The Nerd before playing Guildenstern in a UK tour of Tom Stoppard's Rosencrantz and Guildenstern Are Dead in 2004 and in 2007, Pasquale played Leo Bloom in the UK tour of Mel Brooks' musical The Producers opposite Cory English and Russ Abbot. He also played Tony Grimsdyke in a UK tour of Doctor in the House opposite Robert Powell in 2012 and played King Arthur in Monty Python's Spamalot at the Playhouse Theatre in London's West End an on a UK tour from 2013 to 2016. He also appeared on Ha! Ha! Holmes on a UK tour in 2013.

In 2018, Pasquale played Frank Spencer in Some Mothers Do 'Ave 'Em based on the BBC sitcom on a UK tour to critical acclaim. Due to the success of the tour, another tour was announced for 2020, however was postponed to 2022 due to the COVID-19 pandemic. In 2021, he played Al in John Godber's April in Paris on a UK tour opposite Sarah Earnshaw.

Pasquale has starred in numerous Christmas pantomimes for various venues across the country such as Birmingham Hippodrome, The Mayflower Theatre, Southampton, Bristol Hippodrome, Theatre Royal, Nottingham and the Royal & Derngate, Northampton.

Television
On 28 December 1996 he starred in his own show The Joe Pasquale Shows.

From 2007-2008, Pasquale voiced Nine the Cat in CBBC's adaptation of Frankenstein's Cat.

In March 2020, he guest starred in an episode of the BBC daytime soap opera Doctors as himself, in an episode titled "The Joe Pasquale Problem".

Reality TV
On 6 December 2004, he won the fourth series of the United Kingdom television show I'm a Celebrity... Get Me Out of Here!. 

In January 2013, Pasqaule became one of twelve celebrities participating in the eighth series of Dancing on Ice, with skating partner Vicky Ogden. They were eliminated on 10 February, claiming sixth place.

Allegations of plagiarism
In 2005, Stewart Lee accused Joe Pasquale of stealing the opening line of his Royal Variety performance from Michael Redmond. Lee further alleged that Pasquale sent his writers to the performances of alternative comedians to copy their jokes. Lee incorporated his criticisms of Pasquale into his 90s Comedian stage show.

Frank Skinner also accused Pasquale of plagiarism in 2010, in using a routine about a rollercoaster prank from one of Skinner's DVD performances.

Other work
Pasquale wrote the musical stage version of Rentaghost which toured the UK in 2006.

On 24 September 2005, the 30-minute Breakout Trust DVD, entitled "It's a Boy", was published. Pasquale starred as the voice of an Innkeeper named Garralus. Alongside him were such performers as Cannon and Ball, and Sir Cliff Richard. The production is a new take on the nativity story and was released in time for Christmas 2005. He performed the voice of a rat in the 2006 film Garfield 2 , also as the voice of The Dentist in 2008's Horton Hears a Who!Pasquale also provides the voice over for Underdog, the cartoon dog mascot of personal injury firm National Accident Helpline.

Personal life
Pasquale has overcome a fear of flying, and has a pilot's licence. He studied Earth Sciences at the Open University and was hoping to graduate with a BSc degree in 2014.

His son, Joe Tracini, is an actor and singer, known for playing Dennis Savage in Hollyoaks.

Pasquale moved to Norfolk in 2022.

Stand-up VHS and DVDsLive and Squeaky (1996)Twin Squeaks (20 October 1997)The Crazy World of Joe Pasquale (26 October 1998)Bubble and Squeak (13 November 2000)The Everything I Have Ever Done & The First of Many Goodbye Tours (1 November 2004)Does He Really Talk Like That? The Live Show (21 November 2005)Return of the Love Monkey'' (20 November 2006)

References

External links
 
Pasquale's fansite
Pasquale on The Price Is Right
Joe Pasquale Interview

1961 births
Living people
English male comedians
People from Grays, Essex
People educated at Torells School
I'm a Celebrity...Get Me Out of Here! (British TV series) winners
English people of Italian descent
English male voice actors
English game show hosts
People from Norfolk